Nora von Bergen (born April 19, 1990 in Münsingen, Canton of Bern) is a former Swiss ice dancer and actress. She competed with her first partner from 2001-2006. She teamed up with David DeFazio in 2006. They are the 2007 Swiss national champions. Von Bergen and Defazio ended their partnership after one year.

After her skating career, she decided to study acting in Switzerland at the drama school SAMTS in Adliswil. In 2021, the first web series "CTRL ALL DEL" (produced by the Zurich University of the Arts) with her as a performer appeared. Among others, the Swiss actors Reto Stalder and Sandro Stocker acted there.

Filmography

References

External links
 
 

1990 births
Living people
People from Münsingen
Swiss female ice dancers
21st-century Swiss actresses
Swiss film actresses